Gary Hunley (born May 22, 1948) is an American film and television actor. He is known for playing Mickey in the final season of the American western television series Sky King.

Hunley was born in Los Angeles, California. In 1954 he appeared in the anthology television series The Pepsi-Cola Playhouse. Hunley appeared in further television programs including Studio 57, Sugarfoot, Leave It to Beaver, Dragnet, Alfred Hitchcock Presents (2 episodes), Dr. Kildare, Cimarron City and Wagon Train. In 1959, he made an appearance as Deputy Clay McCord's young brother Brandon McCord in the western television series The Deputy.

Hunley played Little Sanfran in the anthology television series Panic!. In 1959, he played the role of Mickey in the final season of the western television series Sky King. His film credits include The Unholy Wife (as Michael), Carnival Rock, The Big Operator and The Legend of Tom Dooley (as The Kid).

References

External links 

Rotten Tomatoes profile

1948 births
Living people
People from Los Angeles
Male actors from Los Angeles
American male child actors
American male television actors
American male film actors
20th-century American male actors
Western (genre) television actors